Harrington Mann (7 October 1864 – 28 February 1937) was a Scottish portrait artist and decorative painter. He was a member of the Glasgow Boys movement in the 1880s.

Art career

Mann was born in Glasgow and began his studies at the Glasgow School of Art. He then studied at the Slade School of Fine Art in London under professor Alphonse Legros. He then studied in Paris under the guidance of the figure painters Gustave Boulanger and Jules-Joseph Lefebvre at the Academie Julian for a short time.

Mann's early paintings from the 1880s are mainly of fishing communities in Yorkshire. He began to develop a name for himself in portrait painting in the 1890s.

He had a strong sense of colour and design for decorating interior walls and for stained glass. In the 1890s he designed for the Scottish firm of J. and W. Guthrie (which became Guthrie and Wells). In 1893 he designed the stained glass for the west window of St Bartholomew's Church, Barbon, in what is now Cumbria.

In 1900, he moved south to London, also opening a studio in New York, where his paintings became popular. In London, he found success in society portraits, especially of children and including members of the British royal family.

Mann's use of colour was influenced by James McNeill Whistler. His bold brushwork shows the influence of John Singer Sargent.

Mann was one of the founder members of the National Portrait Society in 1911.

Family

He was the second son of John Mann (1827–1910), a chartered accountant, and Mary Newton Harrington (1834–1917), a novelist. John's father was also a painter, John Mann (1797-1827).

Mann married the interior decorator Florence Sabine-Pasley (known as Dolly Mann).

Mann had three daughters, who appeared in several of his paintings, including Cathleen Sabine, an artist, who married Francis Douglas, 11th Marquess of Queensberry and then J.R. Follett.

Works

Mann painted a large number of society portraits, including the following.

 Portraits
 The Fairy Tale, 1902
 Miss Tibbie Nairn, 1900
 The Red Hat, 1920

 Decorative paintings
 The Study for Mardi Gras, 1910

 Landscapes
 Boy and Black Pigs, 1886
 Tangiers, 1889
Café en Provence, 1930

 Interiors

In 1888, Mann painted the interior of the hall of the Ewing Gilmour Institute for Girls, Smollet Street (and Gilmour Street), Alexandria, near Glasgow, designed by John Archibald Campbell. (The building has been known as a Masonic Hall since 1915.)

Exhibitions

Mann's works are today exhibited in the Tate Gallery and in the Glasgow Museums.

 Royal Academy from 1885 onwards
 International Society from 1898 onwards
 Leicester Galleries, 1908 (solo)

Reception

The Century Magazine of 1908 praised Mann and his painting A Fairy-Tale. Mann, the magazine reported, had "always showed singular versatility, having devoted himself by turns to decorative cartoons for stained glass, to mural painting, landscape, genre, and portraiture." The magazine went on "While his likenesses usually maintain a high level of attainment, it is in certain less formal portrait groups that Mr. Mann reveals perhaps the most sympathetic and attractive phase of his talent." Of A Fairy-Tale, the magazine opined that he displayed "refreshing charm and [a] touch of juvenile romance".

Death
Mann died in New York City on 28 February 1937.

References

Bibliography

 Chamot, Mary; Farr, Dennis; Butlin, Martin. The Modern British Paintings, Drawings and Sculpture, London 1964, II.
 Wood, Christopher, The Dictionary of Victorian Artists 2nd edition, Woodbridge, 1978.

External links

 
 Art Renewal Center Museum: Harrington Mann (paintings by Mann, and 2 photographs of the artist)
 Metropolitan Museum of Art Libraries: Catalogue of New Portraits by Harrington Mann, 1912 (lists 10 portraits inc. Lady Diana Manners)
 Duchess of Rutland and Harrington Mann

Artists from Glasgow
Scottish landscape painters
Scottish portrait painters
Glasgow School
Alumni of the Slade School of Fine Art
Alumni of the Glasgow School of Art
Académie Julian alumni
1864 births
1937 deaths
19th-century Scottish painters
Scottish male painters
20th-century Scottish painters
Scottish people of German descent
19th-century Scottish male artists
20th-century Scottish male artists